Pristicon trimaculatus, the 'three-spot cardinalfish,  is a nocturnal fish that lives in the Western Pacific Ocean, living around inshore coral reefs in waters around the Ryukyu Islands and  Western Australia and the southern Great Barrier Reef, east to Samoa and the Marshall Islands. This species is uncommon. Juveniles have intense, dark markings on a light background, while adults' markings are dusky.

Information
 Depth range: 1-34 m
 Water type: Marine
 Temperature range: 25.2 - 29.3°C
 Nitrate: 0.026 - 0.617 ppm
 Salinity: 32.019 - 35.911 ppt
 Oxygen: 4.271 - 4.746 ppt
 Phosphate: 0.085 - 0.415 ppm
 Maximum size: 14.2 cm standard length (male/unsexed)
 Aquarium trade: Unusual 
 Diet: Benthic invertebrates

Further reading
 Eol's Apogon trimaculatus Info 
 Fishwise's Apogon trimaculatus Informarion

External links
 

Apogonidae
Fish described in 1828
Taxa named by Georges Cuvier